Tabernaemontana markgrafiana is a species of plant in the family Apocynaceae. It is found in Panama, and northwestern South America.

References

markgrafiana